Lazar "Larry" Sitsky  (born 10 September 1934) is an Australian composer, pianist, and music educator and scholar.  His long term legacy is still to be assessed, but through his work to date he has made a significant contribution to the Australian music tradition.

Sitsky was the first Australian to be invited to the USSR on a cultural exchange visit, organised by the Australian Department of Foreign Affairs in 1977.  He has received many awards for his compositions: the Albert H. Maggs Composition Award in 1968, and again in 1981; the Alfred Hill Memorial Prize for his String Quartet in 1968; a China Fellowship in 1983; a Fulbright Award in 1988–89, and an Advance Australia Award for achievement in music (1989). He has also been awarded the inaugural prize from the Fellowship of Composers (1989), the first National Critics' Award, and the inaugural Australian Composers' Fellowship presented by the Music Board of the Australia Council, which gave him the opportunity to write a large number of compositions (including concerti for violin, guitar, and orchestra), to revise his book Busoni and the Piano, and to commence work as a pianist on the Anthology of Australian Piano Music.

Life and career 
Larry Sitsky was born in Tianjin (formerly Tientsin), China, of Russian-Jewish émigré parents. He demonstrated perfect pitch at an early age, by identifying notes or chords played in a different room. He studied piano from an early age, gave his first public concert at the age of nine, and started writing music soon thereafter. His family was forced to leave China during Mao's rule. They came to Australia in 1951 and settled in Sydney. He had sat for Cambridge University Overseas Matriculation before leaving China. His first studies at university were in engineering, at his parents' insistence. This was not successful and "he convinced his parents to allow him to pursue his passion, music". He obtained a scholarship to the New South Wales Conservatorium of Music, where he studied piano, briefly with Alexander Sverjensky but mainly with Winifred Burston (a student of Ferruccio Busoni and Egon Petri), and composition, graduating in 1955. In 1959, he won a scholarship to the San Francisco Conservatory, where he studied with Egon Petri for two years. Returning to Australia, he joined the staff of the Queensland Conservatorium of Music, after being accepted sight unseen based on a recommendation from Petri. His Australian studies and his subsequent studies in the United States, "combined with the Russian heritage from his early studies in China, [make] him a unique repository of piano techniques and tradition which is acknowledged internationally".

A grant from the Myer Foundation in 1965 enabled him to conduct research into the music of Ferruccio Busoni, on whom he has written extensively. In 1966 he was appointed Head of Keyboard Studies at the Canberra School of Music, was later Head of Musicology and was Head of Composition Studies. He is currently Emeritus Professor of the Australian National University in Canberra.

Sitsky has always performed as well as composed, and as a student won performance awards.  He believes that composers should perform, believing that "without this communion with a live audience, music-making all too easily becomes over-intellectualised, sterile and arid". As a performer, he champions twentieth-century repertoire.

In terms of composition, Sitsky has regularly changed his musical language to "express himself in ways that are not familiar and 'easy'".

Larry Sitsky attracted attention when he, among others, criticised the Keating government for giving successive artistic fellowships to the pianist Geoffrey Tozer.  He explained that his criticism was not personal against Tozer, who was a friend of his, but that it was a matter of principle.

A biography of Sitsky was published in the USA in 1997.
Listen to the interview with an Australian composer, pianist, and music educator and scholar Larry Sitsky on SBS Radio, Australia in Russian (Presented by Tina Vassiliev)Russian | Pусский

Works 
Sitsky has published the two-volume The Classical Reproducing Piano Roll and Music of the Repressed Russian Avant-Garde, 1900–1929, and has recorded a number of CDs of Australian piano music, including the complete sonatas of Roy Agnew.

He has had works commissioned by many leading Australian and international bodies, such as the ABC, Musica Viva Australia, the International Clarinet Society, the Sydney International Piano Competition, Flederman and the International Flute Convention. His collection of teaching pieces, Century, has been published by Currency Press, and he also has an open contract to publish anything he wishes with his New York publisher, Seesaw Music Corporation.

In August 2011, Sitsky announced plans to write a series of operas based on the stories of Enid Blyton.  The works were premiered by the ANU School of Music.

Personal life 
He is married to the Czech-born Magda Sitsky.

Selected works

Opera 
The Fall of the House of Usher, 1965, Libretto: Gwen Harwood. Premiered 19 August 1965, Theatre Royal, Hobart, conductor Rex Hobcroft
Lenz, 1970, Libretto: Gwen Harwood. Recorded Australian Broadcasting Corporation (Adelaide) 1982, conductor Christopher Lyndon-Gee; Lenz, Gerald English, tenor.
Fiery Tales, 1975, after Chaucer and Boccaccio.
Voices in Limbo, 1977, Libretto: Gwen Harwood.
The Golem, 1980, Libretto: Gwen Harwood. Premiered by The Australian Opera under Christopher Lyndon-Gee, conductor, in 1993. Commercial CD recording released 2005 by ABC Classics (Polygram), edited from 1993 live performances.
De Profundis, 1982, Libretto: Gwen Harwood.
Three scenes from Aboriginal life: 1. Campfire scene, 2. Mathina, 3. Legend of the Brolga, 1988

Ballet 
Sinfonia for Ten Players ("The Dark Refuge") (1964)

Orchestral 
 Concerto for Orchestra (1984)
 Symphony in Four Movements (premiered by the Canberra Symphony Orchestra under Robert Bailey, 23 May 2001)

Concertante
 Piano Concerto (1991, rev, 1994)
 Cello Concerto (1993)
 Violin Concerto No. 4 (1998)
 Zohar: Sephardic Concerto for mandolin and orchestra (1998)
 Jewish folk song (1955)

Solo instrument 
Improvisation and Cadenza for solo viola (1964)
Khavar for solo trombone (1984)

Vocal 
Incidental music to Faust for solo piano and three sopranos, 1996
Seven Zen Songs for voice and viola (2005)

Unclassified
 Ten Sepphiroth of the Kabbala
 Mysterium Cosmographicum
 The Secret Gates of the House of Osiris

Awards and honours 
In 1997 the Australian National University awarded him its first Higher Doctorate in Fine Arts. In 1998, he was elected Fellow of the Australian Academy of the Humanities. He is currently a Distinguished Visiting Fellow, as well as Emeritus Professor at the Australian National University.

In 2000 he was appointed a Member of the Order of Australia (AM) for service to music as a composer, musicologist, pianist and educator; and in the same year he received the Centenary Medal for service to Australian society through music. In 2017 Sitsky was appointed an Officer of the Order of Australia for distinguished service to the arts as a composer and concert pianist, to music education as a researcher and mentor, and through musical contributions to Australia's contemporary culture.

ARIA Music Awards
The ARIA Music Awards are a set of annual ceremonies presented by Australian Recording Industry Association (ARIA), which recognise excellence, innovation, and achievement across all genres of the music of Australia. They commenced in 1987.

! 
|-
| 1989
| Contemporary Australian Piano
| ARIA Award for Best Independent Release
| 
|

Don Banks Music Award
The Don Banks Music Award was established in 1984 to publicly honour a senior artist of high distinction who has made an outstanding and sustained contribution to music in Australia. It was founded by the Australia Council in honour of Don Banks, Australian composer, performer and the first chair of its music board.

|-
| 1984
| Larry Sitsky
| Don Banks Music Award
| 
|-

Notes

References 
 Cotter, Jim (2004a) "Larry Sitsky and the Australian musical tradition", National Library of Australia News, XIV (12), September 2004, pp. 3–6
 Cotter, Jim (2004b). Sitsky: Conversations with the Composer. National Library of Australia. .
 Crispin, Judith (2007). The Esoteric Musical Tradition of Ferruccio Busoni and Its Reinvigoration in the Music of Larry Sitsky: The Operas Doktor Faust and The Golem, with a preface by Larry Sitsky. Lewiston, N.Y.: Edwin Mellen Press.

Further reading 
Holmes, Robyn, and Peter Campbell (2001). "Sitsky, Larry [Lazarus]". The New Grove Dictionary of Music and Musicians, second edition, edited by Stanley Sadie and John Tyrrell. London: Macmillan Publishers.
Lyndon-Gee, Christopher (1992). "An Eclectic in Australia: Christopher Lyndon-Gee Introduces Larry Sitsky". The Musical Times 133, no. 1793 (July: "Aspects of Australian Music"): 334–35.

External links 
Australian Music Centre
Australasian Performing Right Association
Professor Larry Sitsky, Australian National University

1934 births
20th-century classical composers
21st-century classical composers
APRA Award winners
Australian Jews
Australian male classical composers
Australian music educators
Fellows of the Australian Academy of the Humanities
Living people
Members of the Order of Australia
Australian opera composers
Jewish opera composers
Piano pedagogues
Pupils of Egon Petri
Academic staff of Queensland Conservatorium Griffith University
Chinese emigrants to Australia
Sydney Conservatorium of Music alumni
Officers of the Order of Australia
Winners of the Albert H. Maggs Composition Award
20th-century Australian male musicians
20th-century Australian musicians
21st-century Australian male musicians
21st-century Australian musicians